Chicago Avenue is a major east–west street in Chicago, Illinois that runs at 800 north from 385 east to 5968 west in the Chicago street address system from which point it enters the suburbs and goes into several different suburban address systems. It originates at the shores of Lake Michigan and Lake Shore Drive (U.S. Route 41) in the Gold Coast neighborhood  in the Near North Side  community area of Chicago in Cook County, Illinois, United States, and runs west to 17th Avenue, where it terminates a few feet north of Lake Street in Melrose Park, IL.

Route description

Chicago Avenue has two lanes west of Austin Avenue, and the Chicago city limits, and roughly four lanes east of Austin Avenue. Like most streets in Chicago, the number and width of lanes varies block by block.

Chicago Avenue runs just to the north of Westlake Hospital in Melrose Park. It then runs through Maywood and over the Des Plaines River before entering River Forest. Chicago Avenue is largely residential through River Forest and Oak Park, with a few small commercial strip malls and developments.

At Austin Avenue, Chicago Avenue becomes part of the addressing system for Chicago as 800 North, or 8 blocks (one mile) north of Madison Street. Chicago Avenue runs through the largely impoverished Austin and Humboldt Park neighborhoods. In the late 1940s and early 1950s at Chicago and Clark Streets, it was home to the first Puerto Rican immigrants to Chicago. They called the area:"La Clark." East of about Kedzie Avenue, Chicago Avenue runs through the West Town and Near North Side areas.

Transportation
Chicago Avenue is primarily served by the 66 Chicago between Fairbanks Court and Austin Avenue.

The following CTA Lines have stations at Chicago Avenue:
Brown Line/Purple Line Express at Franklin Street
Red Line at State Street
Blue Line at Milwaukee Avenue

References

Streets in Chicago